Nerd Prom may refer to:
San Diego Comic-Con International, a major international fan convention
The White House Correspondents' Dinner, an annual dinner involving major political and media figures
The American Society of Hematology Annual Meeting, a yearly conference of blood doctors from around the world